The Blood of Heroes is a Brooklyn-based music project started in 2009. The first incarnation consisted of Submerged, Justin Broadrick, Dr. Israel, Enduser, Mark Gregor Filip, Balázs Pándi and Bill Laswell. KJ Sawka, Jason Selden and Tony Maimone have also contributed significantly to the project. They have released three albums, The Blood of Heroes, Remain in 2010, and The Waking Nightmare in 2012, via Ohm Resistance.

History
They project was founded in 2009, taking its name from the 1989 post-apocalyptic movie The Blood of Heroes starring Rutger Hauer. The first album, titled The Blood of Heroes, was released by Ohm Resistance on April 4, 2010. In 2012, The Waking Nightmare was released and was placed as fourth on The Quietus' "Best Metal of 2013" list.

Discography 
Studio albums
The Blood of Heroes (Ohm Resistance, 2010)
The Waking Nightmare (Ohm Resistance, 2012)
Nine Cities (Ohm Resistance, 2023)

Remix albums
Remain (Ohm Resistance, 2010)

References

External links 

Alternative rock groups from New York (state)
Musical groups established in 2009
Musical groups from Brooklyn